Work It Out Wombats! is a  children's animated television series that premiered on February 6, 2023, on PBS Kids. The series is produced by GBH Kids and Pipeline Studios.

Plot 
The series follows a playful trio, Malik, Zadie, and Zeke, creative marsupial siblings who live with their grandmother (Super) in her treehouse apartment complex, known as the Treeborhood. Each episode features them encountering a problem of some kind and using computational thinking to solve it. Each episode has a 90-second music video in between them.

Characters 

 Malik (voiced by Ian Ho) is the grey wombat and the older brother of the siblings. He is meticulous and organized, but still likes having fun with his siblings.
 Zadie (voiced by Mia Swami-Nathan) is the purple wombat and the middle-aged sister of the siblings. She likes to create fantastical ideas that are shown in a cardboard/puffball/popsicle stick art style.
 Zeke (voiced by Rain Janjua) is the yellow wombat and the younger brother of the siblings. He always carries a stuffed animal named Snout with him. He likes asking lots of questions and talking nonstop. 
 Super (voiced by Yanna McIntosh) is the grandmother of the wombats. She is the superintendent of the Treeborhood. She is open minded and encourages her grandchildren to make mistakes.
 Mr. E (voiced by Joseph Motiki) is an iguana who owns the Everything Emporium. He is very organized and seems grumpy most of the time, but he ultimately does care for the wombats. He has a crush on Ellie, as she is the only person that he is openly affectionate towards.
 Ellie (voiced by Tymika Tafari) is a moose of Jamaican descent who is the Treeborhood's EMT. She is reliable and very kind-hearted. Some of her interests include fitness and jumping on a trampoline.
 Louisa (voiced by Claire Mackness) is a 4-year-old adopted tarsier who wants to know everything. Her catchphrase is "Did/do you not know?" She is best friends with Zeke.
 Leiko and Duffy (voiced by Ana Sani and Shoshana Sperling respectively) are two kangaroos who are a lesbian couple and the adoptive mothers of Louisa. They used to be in a rock music duo together. Duffy works at the Eat 'N Greet, while Leiko is the COO of the Creation Station.
 Sammy (voiced by Baeyen Hoffman) is a young, laid back emerald tree boa snake with Puerto Rican heritage. He is best friends with Malik.
 Quique, real name Enrique (voiced by B'atz' Recinos) is the single father of Sammy. He is a teacher at the Starlight Room.
 JunJun (voiced by Roman Pesino) is a Philippine Eagle who likes singing and playing guitar. He occasionally speaks Tagalog words. He is best friends with Zadie.
 Kaya (voiced by Gianelle Miranda) is JunJun's 16-year-old sister. She is a waitress at the Eat 'N Greet and a social media influencer.
 Amado (voiced by Mark Andrada) is JunJun's father. He's the arborist of the Treeborhood and frequently cuts topiary trees. He wears a brown Barong Tagalog.
 Gabriela (voiced by Carolyn Fe) is JunJun's grandmother. She's the local mail carrier.
 The crab family: Kat, Kit, Carly, CeCe, and Clyde are farmers at the Sow 'N Grow. They are rather timid. Carly, CeCe, and Clyde are triplets who function as a single character. Carly wears red, CeCe wears green, and Clyde wears blue. Also, Cece is the only crab who wears square glasses while Kit, Kat, Carly & Clyde wear round glasses. Kit and Kat are their father and mother. The triplets are all voiced by Julie Lemieux, Kat is voiced by Athena Karkanis, and Kit is voiced by Dan Chameroy.
 Fergus and Felicia Fishman (voiced by Michael Gordin Shore (Fergus) and Katie Griffin (Felicia)) are fish entrepreneurs who live in a tank near the top of the Treeborhood. They have three babies: Flip, Frannie, and Finn.

Episodes

Development
The themes and ideas of the show were previously covered in Aha Island, a WGBH multimedia project about monkeys who use computational thinking. Some elements from Aha Island were recycled for Work It Out Wombats, such as the existence of the Everything Emporium. The series was greenlit in October 2020, under the working title of Wombats! Wombats were chosen as the species of the main characters because they are underused in media. Early-career writers were granted fellowships so they could bring diverse viewpoints and BIPOC representation to the series. The production team worked to ensure authentic representations of names, language, and some of the cultural origins found with the animals themselves, while keeping in mind that animals are not a proxy for race and ethnicity. For example, JunJun and his family are Philippine eagles, while Ellie is a moose; an animal not found in Jamaica.

Casting
The producers deliberately sought out voice actors that match the ethnicity of the characters to ensure authenticity. Rain Janjua, the voice of Zeke, originally auditioned for the role of Malik for being asked to try out for Zeke. To create the voice, Janjua tried to recall how his voice sounded at five years old.

Animation
The series is animated in Toon Boom Harmony. The characters are animated using complicated rigging systems that allow the animators to draw things by hand, thus giving each character their own nuances and walk cycles. The designs of the characters and settings are rounded in order to create a friendly, welcoming feel. Curvilinear perspective and hazing is used for the backgrounds to make the characters stand out.

Marketing
To promote the series, a walkaround mascot of Zeke traveled to different places in the Boston area from February 22 to February 24, under the title "Zeke's Big Boston Adventure." Zeke went to the Boston Children's Museum, the Franklin Park Zoo, and the Boston Public Library. The Mayor of Boston, Michelle Wu, declared February 21 as "Work It Out Wombats Day."

See also 

 List of programs broadcast by PBS Kids

References

External links 

 Official website
 Work It Out Wombats! at IMDb

2020s American animated television series
2020s American children's television series
2023 American television series debuts
2020s Canadian animated television series
2020s Canadian children's television series
2023 Canadian television series debuts
2020s preschool education television series
American children's animated television series
American preschool education television series
Animated preschool education television series
Canadian children's animated television series
Canadian preschool education television series
Animated television series about children
Animated television series about siblings
English-language television shows
PBS Kids shows
PBS original programming
Television series by WGBH
Television series impacted by the COVID-19 pandemic
LGBT-related animated series